, or TEL, is a Japanese electronics and semiconductor company headquartered in Akasaka, Minato-ku, Tokyo, Japan. The company was founded as Tokyo Electron Laboratories, Inc. in 1963.

TEL is best known as a supplier of equipment to fabricate integrated circuits (IC), flat panel displays (FPD), and photovoltaic cells (PV). , or TED, is a subsidiary of TEL specializing in semiconductor devices, electronic components, and networking devices. As of 2011, TEL is the largest manufacturer of IC and FPD production equipment.

On September 24, 2013 Tokyo Electron and Applied Materials announced a merger, forming a new company to be called Eteris. Eteris would have been the world's largest supplier of semiconductor processing equipment, with a total market value of approximately $29 billion. On 26 April 2015, the merger was cancelled due to antitrust concerns in the United States.

Origins
On November 11, 1963, Tokyo Electron Laboratories Incorporated was founded by Tokuo Kubo and Toshio Kodaka, largely funded by Tokyo Broadcasting System (TBS), with a capital of over five million yen. Later that year, their office opened in the TBS main building and began manufacturing thousands of quality-control and importing diffusion furnaces made by Thermco and selling Japanese-made car radios.

In 1965, the company approached a rapidly growing business in the market, Fairchild Semiconductor Corporation and agreed to serve as a sales agency for them, increasing their capital to twenty million yen and began exporting IC testers, IC sockets, IC connectors, and other similar computer components.

The company opened an office in San Francisco, California and their new branch, Pan Electron in 1968 established themselves as the only stocking distributor of imported electronic components in the region.

One year later, they opened their Yokohama office and established Teltron, a major manufacturer and distributor of car stereos, expanding their headquarters to fill the entire TBS-2 building and raising their capital to 100 million yen.

Products

Semiconductor Production Equipment (SPE) 
TEL produces Semiconductor Production Equipment (SPE) for the following purposes:
Thermal processing 
Deposition of thin layers of dielectric material between transistors onto the silicon wafer surface in a heated low-pressure chemical vapor deposition (LPCVD) or oxidation process
Photoresist coating/developing
Photoresist coating and developing to project a microscopic circuitry pattern on the wafer in photolithography
Plasma etching

Wet surface preparation
Wafer surface cleaning to remove foreign particles or contaminants such as dust
Single wafer chemical vapor deposition
Deposition of thin layers of various materials, such as tungsten, tungsten silicide, titanium, titanium nitride, and tantalum oxide
Wafer probing 
Wafer probers for testing the functionality and performance of each die on the wafer
Material modification/doping
Surface modification and doping using gas cluster ion beam (GCIB) technology
Corrective etching/trimming
Corrective etching and trimming of thin films such as silicon, silicon nitride, silicon dioxide, aluminum nitride, and metals
Integrated metrology (co-developed by TEL and KLA Tencor)
Advanced Packaging

Group companies

The Tokyo Electron Group consists of TEL and the following subsidiaries: 
 TEL Epion Inc.
 TEL FSI, Inc.
 TEL Solar
 TEL Technology Center, America, LLC
 TEL Venture Capital, Inc.
 Tokyo Electron Device Limited
 Tokyo Electron Yamanashi Limited
 Tokyo Electron Tohoku Limited
 Tokyo Electron Kyushu Limited
 Tokyo Electron Miyagi Limited
 Tokyo Electron Technology Development Institute, Inc.
 Tokyo Electron Software Technologies Limited
 Tokyo Electron FE Limited
 Tokyo Electron BP Limited
 Tokyo Electron PV Limited
 Tokyo Electron TS Limited
 Tokyo Electron Agency Limited
 Tokyo Electron U.S. Holdings, Inc.
 Tokyo Electron America, Inc.
 Tokyo Electron Europe Limited — Head Office (Crawley, England)
 German Branch
 Italian Branch
 Netherlands Branch
 Irish Branch
 French Branch
 Tokyo Electron Israel Limited
 Tokyo Electron Korea Limited
 Tokyo Electron Korea Solution Limited
 Tokyo Electron Taiwan Limited
 Tokyo Electron (Shanghai) Limited
 Tokyo Electron (Shanghai) Logistic Center Limited
 Tokyo Electron (Kunshan) Limited
 Timbre Technologies, Inc.

Research and development
TEL's Leading-edge Process Development Center is located in Nirasaki, Yamanashi. TEL also has the Kansai Technology Center in Amagasaki, Hyogo Prefecture and the Sendai Design and Development Center in Sendai, Miyagi Prefecture. TEL Technology Center, America, LLC in Albany, New York is the R&D center in the United States. TEL is one of the partners of IMEC, a microelectronics and nanoelectronics research center in Leuven, Belgium.

In July 2014, TEL announced the establishment of joint assembly lab with Institute of Microelectronics in Singapore. The lab is focused on the research and development of Wafer Level Packaging and assembly, to address the need of Internet of Things with devices of high performance and low power consumption.

Sponsorships 

TEL supports association football in Japan by sponsoring the J. League as a whole and the football club Ventforet Kofu based in Kofu and Nirasaki as well as the rest of Yamanashi Prefecture.

The company has acquired naming rights of two multipurpose halls: 
 owned by Nirasaki City
 owned by Miyagi Prefecture (currently closed due to the heavy earthquake damage)

See also 

 Semiconductor device fabrication
 Semiconductor equipment sales leaders by year
 Tokyo Broadcasting System

References

External links
 
 Brief Description From Yahoo Businesses
 PR Newswire Review
 Bloomberg Stats

Companies listed on the Tokyo Stock Exchange
Equipment semiconductor companies
Electronics companies of Japan
Defense companies of Japan
Tokyo Broadcasting System
Engineering companies based in Tokyo
Manufacturing companies based in Tokyo
Japanese brands
1963 establishments in Japan
Japanese companies established in 1963